Sawa Station is the name of two train stations in Japan:

Sawa Station (Ibaraki) (佐和駅)
 Sawa Station (Nagano) (沢駅)